The enzyme multiple inositol-polyphosphate phosphatase (EC 3.1.3.62) catalyzes the reaction 

myo-inositol hexakisphosphate + H2O  myo-inositol pentakisphosphate (mixed isomers) + phosphate

This enzyme belongs to the family of hydrolases, specifically those acting on phosphoric monoester bonds.  The systematic name is 1D-myo-inositol-hexakisphosphate 5-phosphohydrolase. Other names in common use include inositol (1,3,4,5)-tetrakisphosphate 3-phosphatase, inositol 1,3,4,5-tetrakisphosphate 3-phosphomonoesterase, inositol 1,3,4,5-tetrakisphosphate-5-phosphomonoesterase, inositol tetrakisphosphate phosphomonoesterase, inositol-1,3,4,5-tetrakisphosphate 3-phosphatase, and MIPP.  This enzyme participates in inositol phosphate metabolism.

References

 
 

EC 3.1.3
Enzymes of unknown structure